Akinyele may refer to:

Akinyele (rapper) (born 1971), American rapper
Akinyele, Oyo State, in Nigeria
Alexander Akinyele (1875-1968), Nigerian clergyman
Isaac Babalola Akinyele (1882-1964), Nigerian king
Theophilus Adeleke Akinyele (1932-2020), Nigerian civil servant
Akinyele Umoja (born 1954), American academic and activist